Tzfat cheese (gvina tsfattit) is a semi-hard salty cheese produced in Israel, originally from sheep's milk. It was first produced  in Safed (Tzfat in Hebrew) in 1840 and is still produced there by descendants of the original cheese makers.

History
The cheese began to be produced in 1818 at HaMeiri Dairy, established in the home of Meir Arzoni (later HaMeiri), who immigrated from Persia.
Gvina sfattit is a mild curd cheese molded in a basket that gives the cheese distinctive circular striations. 
The cheese has an elastic texture and low fat content. The milk is pasteurized at a low , which preserves the food proteins. Trimming is based largely on the action of enzymes contained in a special ferment and on calcium chloride rather than on the action of lactic acid. The fermentation is quick, about an hour. After the separation of most of the whey, the cheese is stored for several hours in straw or plastic baskets to drain the remaining whey and to form its round shape. 
For the remainder of the draining time, the cheese is inverted several times to help the draining and to form the basket's pattern on all sides.

Fresh Tzfat cheese is used in salads and sandwiches. The aged variety can be grated for use in baking or cooking.

Water Buffalo Tzfat cheese is usually flavored with nigella seeds.

See also

 List of sheep milk cheeses
Israeli cuisine

References

Israeli cuisine
Sheep's-milk cheeses
Middle Eastern cheeses